Philipp Winterberg (born in 1978) is a German author. His books have been reviewed and recommended by Kirkus Reviews, Die Tageszeitung, Foreword Reviews, Börsenblatt, Österreichisches Schulportal and many more. 

His children's book Am I small? is available for every country on earth in at least one official language making it the world's first "World Children's Book". In 2020, Am I small? was exhibited by the German National Library as the most translated German book of all time (more than 200 languages and dialects).

Bibliography 
Selected works from the catalog of the German National Library.
 2011 – In Here, Out There! (Da rein, da raus!, 70+ languages and dialects)
 2013 – Die Herleitung von Instrumenten der Einstellungsänderung aus einer Theorie der Einstellung
 2013 – Am I small? (Bin ich klein?, 220+ languages and dialects)
 2014 – St. James´ Way in a Tuxedo (Jakobsweg im Smoking)
 2014 – Drölf: Eine Sch(l)afgeschichte
 2016 – Just Like Dad/Wie Papa
 2017 – The Safest Place in the World/Der sicherste Ort der Welt
 2019 – Trekking-Tipps Nepal & Himalaya

Adaptations 
 2014 – A radio drama adaptation of Drölf was produced by the West German Broadcasting Cologne (WDR 5) in 2014 and aired several times as part of the series Ohrenbär – Radiogeschichten für kleine Leute, Klingendes Bilderbuch, Bärenbude am Abend, etc. 
 2020 – The adaptation of Drölf was published by the working group of public broadcasters of the Federal Republic of Germany (ARD) in 2020 as part of the online series Kinderhörspiel im WDR

Awards and Prizes 
 2014 – Bayern 2-Favorit, Bayerischer Rundfunk
 2018 – Münster: Vielfalt machen, Münster
 2019 – Ehrenurkunde beim Heimatpreis 2019, Münster
 2019 – KIMI-Siegel für Vielfalt in der Kinder- und Jugendliteratur (KIMI Longseller), KIMI-Jurys

References

External links 
 Official website
 Philipp Winterberg at German National Library
 Philipp Winterberg at Amazon.com

20th-century German writers
Living people
1978 births